Ascetostoma ringens is a species of sea snail, a marine gastropod mollusk in the family Chilodontidae.

Description
The size of the shell varies between 8 mm and 10 mm.

Distribution
This marine species occurs in the Sulu Sea off the Philippines.

References

 Vilvens C. (2017). New species and new records of Chilodontidae (Gastropoda: Vetigastropoda: Seguenzioidea) from the Pacific Ocean. Novapex. 18 (Hors Série 11): 1-67

External links
 To Encyclopedia of Life
 Schepman M.M. (1908). The Prosobranchia of the Siboga Expedition. Part I. Rhipidoglossa and Docoglossa. Siboga Expeditie, 49a: 1-107, pl. 1-9. Leiden, E. J. Brill.
 Herbert, D. G. (2012). A Revision of the Chilodontidae (Gastropoda: Vetigastropoda: Seguenzioidea) of Southern Africa and the South-Western Indian Ocean. African Invertebrates. 53(2): 381-502.

ringens
Gastropods described in 1908